Group 3 of the 1958 FIFA World Cup took place from 8 to 17 June 1958. The group consisted of Hungary, Mexico, Sweden, and Wales.

Standings

 Wales finished ahead of Hungary by winning a play-off

Matches
All times listed are local time.

Sweden vs Mexico

Hungary vs Wales

Mexico vs Wales

Sweden vs Hungary

Sweden vs Wales

Hungary vs Mexico

Play-off: Wales vs Hungary

References

External links
 1958 FIFA World Cup archive

1958 FIFA World Cup
Wales at the 1958 FIFA World Cup
Mexico at the 1958 FIFA World Cup
Hungary at the 1958 FIFA World Cup
Sweden at the 1958 FIFA World Cup